Callianassidae is a family of ghost shrimp of the order Decapoda.

Subfamilies and genera
Callianassidae is divided into 41 genera:

 Aqaballianassa Poore, Dworschak, Robles, Mantelatto & Felder, 2019
 Arenallianassa Poore, Dworschak, Robles, Mantelatto & Felder, 2019
 Biffarius R.B. Manning & Felder, 1991
†Brecanclawu Schweitzer & Feldmann, 2001
 Callianassa Leach, 1814
 Caviallianassa Poore, Dworschak, Robles, Mantelatto & Felder, 2019
 Cheramoides K. Sakai, 2011
 Cheramus Bate, 1888
†Comoxianassa Schweitzer, Feldmann, Ćosović, Ross & Waugh, 2009
 Coriollianassa Poore, Dworschak, Robles, Mantelatto & Felder, 2019
†Cowichianassa Schweitzer, Feldmann, Ćosović, Ross & Waugh, 2009
†Eoglypturus Beschin, De Angeli, Checchi & Zarantonello, 2005
 Filhollianassa Poore, Dworschak, Robles, Mantelatto & Felder, 2019
 Fragillianassa Poore, Dworschak, Robles, Mantelatto & Felder, 2019
 Gilvossius R.B. Manning & Felder, 1992
 Jocullianassa Poore, Dworschak, Robles, Mantelatto & Felder, 2019
 Lipkecallianassa K. Sakai, 2002
†Melipal Schweitzer & Feldmann, 2006
†Mesostylus Bronn & Roemer, 1852
 Necallianassa Heard & R.B. Manning, 1998
 Neotrypaea R.B. Manning & Felder, 1991
 Notiax R.B. Manning & Felder, 1991
 Paratrypaea Komai & Tachikawa, 2008
†Pleuronassa Ossó-Morales, Garassino, Vega & Artal, 2011
 Poti Rodrigues & R.B. Manning, 1992
 Praedatrypaea Poore, Dworschak, Robles, Mantelatto & Felder, 2019
†Protocallianassa Beurlen, 1930
†Psammionassa Schweitzer, Feldmann, Kues & Bridge, 2017
 Pugnatrypaea Poore, Dworschak, Robles, Mantelatto & Felder, 2019
†Rathbunassa Hyžný in Bermúdez, Gómez-Cruz, Hyžný, Moreno-Bedmar, Barragán, Sánchez & Vega, 2013
 Rayllianassa Komai & Tachikawa, 2008
 Rudisullianassa Poore, Dworschak, Robles, Mantelatto & Felder, 2019
 Scallasis Bate, 1888
†Semiranina Bachmayer, 1954
 Spinicallianassa Poore, Dworschak, Robles, Mantelatto & Felder, 2019
 Tastrypaea Poore, Dworschak, Robles, Mantelatto & Felder, 2019
 Trypaea Dana, 1852
†Turbiocheir Schweitzer, Feldmann, Casadío & Rodriguez Raising, 2012
†Vecticallichirus Quayle & Collins, 2012
†Vegarthron Schweitzer & Feldmann, 2002

References

Thalassinidea
Decapod families